Boot Hill, or Boothill, is the given name of many cemeteries, chiefly in the Western United States. During the 19th and early 20th century it was a common name for the burial grounds of gunfighters, or those who "died with their boots on" (i.e., violently).

Origin of term 
Although many towns use the name "Boot Hill," the first graveyard named "Boot Hill" was at Hays, Kansas, 5 years before the founding of Dodge City, Kansas. The term alludes to the fact that many of its occupants were cowboys who "died with their boots on," the implication here being they died violently, as in gunfights or by hanging, and not of natural causes.  The term became commonplace throughout the Old West, with some Boot Hills becoming famous, such as Dodge City, Kansas, Tombstone, Arizona, and Deadwood, South Dakota.

Boothill Graveyard
The most notable use of the name "Boot Hill" is at the Boothill Graveyard in Tombstone, Arizona.  Formerly called the "Tombstone Cemetery", the plot features the graves of Billy Clanton, Frank McLaury and Tom McLaury; the three men who were killed during the famed Gunfight at the O.K. Corral.

Located on the northwest corner of the town, the graveyard is believed to hold over 300 persons, 205 of which are recorded. This was due to some people (especially Chinese and Jewish immigrants) being buried without record. There is a separate Jewish cemetery nearby with some markers restored, and there are also marked graves of Chinese. However, most of the loss was due to neglect of grave markers and theft of these wooden relics as souvenirs. For example, when former Tombstone Mayor John Clum visited Tombstone for the first Helldorado celebration in 1929, he was unable to locate the grave of his wife Mary, who had been buried in Boothill.

The Tombstone "boothill" cemetery was closed in late 1886, as the new "City Cemetery" on Allen Street opened. Thereafter, Boothill was referred to as the "old city cemetery" and neglected. It was used after that only to bury a few later outlaws (some legally hanged and one shot in a robbery), as well as a few colorful Western characters and one man (Emmett Crook Nunnally) who had spent many volunteer hours restoring it.

Currently, the Boothill Graveyard is open to the public for a $5 fee, and is a popular stop for tourists visiting Tombstone.

Boot Hill Museum

The Boot Hill Museum is located on the original location of the Boot Hill Cemetery in Dodge City, Kansas.

In popular culture
Boot Hill is the name of the cemetery in Dodge City in the Gunsmoke radio series. In many episodes, the marshal (Matt Dillon) would allude to "putting you in Boot Hill", or "another man headed to Boot Hill". In the first season of the Gunsmoke television series, the introduction to each episode showed Matt Dillon walking around Boot Hill reflecting on the deaths of men buried there.

Boot Hill cemetery is a main plot point in the Twilight Zone episode Mr. Garrity and the Graves.

Boothill Graveyards are referenced in many films such as Tombstone (1993), Wyatt Earp (1994), The Magnificent Seven (1960) and Gunfight at the O.K. Corral (1957), during which it was repeatedly sung over the recurring title theme song by Frankie Laine. In the later half of the movie Laine changes the theme to:

Boot Hill is the name of a role playing game first published in 1975 by TSR, Inc., the original publisher of Dungeons & Dragons. It was the third game released by TSR and notable as one of the first games to use ten-sided dice.

Boot Hill also appears in the first-person shooter video game Borderlands 2, located in 'The Dust', and playing home to a 'truxican standoff'.

Carl Perkins wrote in 1959 a song "The Ballad of Boot Hill". Johnny Cash recorded it for Columbia Records and it was released in the same year.

A Spaghetti Western named Boot Hill was released in 1969 and it featured Terence Hill and Bud Spencer.

The first of three parts that compose the Neil Young song "Country Girl", that appears in his 1970 album with Crosby, Stills & Nash, "Déjà Vu", is called "Whiskey Boot Hill".

The Outlaws' song "Hurry Sundown" also references "lying" an unnamed character in "Boot Hill".

Several themes from Bob Dylan’s soundtrack album "Pat Garrett and Billy The Kid" (1973) contain the verse "Up to Boot Hill they'd like to send ya".

The song "The Ballad of Billy the Kid" from Billy Joel's 1973 Album Piano Man contains the lyrics "And he never had a sweetheart, but he finally found a home, underneath the boothill grave that bears his name".

"Boot Hill" (unknown) is the first track on Stevie Ray Vaughan's 1991 posthumous release The Sky is Crying. It was recorded in early 1989 and is one of the last fully produced songs completed prior to his untimely death in 1990.

In cricket, the term 'Boot Hill' is used to refer to the fielding position of short-leg because of its proximity to the batsman and high likelihood of being hit by the ball, making the position particularly dangerous. Players fielding in this position typically wear a helmet and other protection.

In the comic book series Preacher, the Saint of Killers rests at a tomb on Boot Hill when not actively pursuing his goals.

Boot Hill Cemetery is the name of the graveyard at Phantom Manor in Disneyland Paris.

In season 5 episode 16 of the animated series Spongebob Squarepants "Pest of the West". The character Spongebuck is told the old sheriff of Dead-Eye Gulch is at Boot Hill.

Gallery

Tombstone, Arizona

Deadwood, South Dakota

Dodge City, Kansas

Miscellaneous

List of places with Boot Hill cemeteries

 Alma, New Mexico
 Anamosa, Iowa
 Billings, Montana
 Bodie, California
 Bonanza, Idaho
 Calabasas, Santa Cruz County, Arizona
 Calico, San Bernardino County, California
 Canyon City, Oregon
 Canyon Diablo, Arizona
 Columbia, California
 Coulson, Montana
 Cripple Creek, Colorado
 Deadwood, South Dakota
 Dodge City, Kansas
 El Paso, Texas
 Fort Sill, Oklahoma
 Guthrie, Oklahoma
 Hartville, Wyoming
 Hays, Kansas
 Idaho City, Idaho
 Leadville, Colorado
 Livermore, California
 Mowry, Arizona
 Newton, Kansas
 Ogallala, Nebraska
 Pioche, Nevada
 Powderville, Montana
 Riley Camp, Quay County, New Mexico
 Seney Township, Michigan
 Sidney, Nebraska
 Silver Reef, Utah
 Skagway, Alaska
 Tascosa, Texas
 Tilden, Texas
 Tincup, Colorado
 Tombstone, Arizona
 Valentine, Nebraska, also known as Minnechaduza Cemetery
 Virginia City, Montana
 Virginia City, Nevada
 Weaver, Arizona
 Webster, Park County, Colorado
 Prison graveyard at New Westminster, British Columbia.
 Cemetery name given by the prisoners at the Japanese-run Batu Lintang POW and civilian internment camp in Kuching, Sarawak, Borneo during World War II.
 Fictional cemetery at the end of Phantom Manor at Disneyland Paris.

See also
 American Frontier
 Bisbee Massacre
 Cowboy Action Shooting
 Fairbank Train Robbery
 Potter's field
 Shootout at Wilson Ranch
 Shootout on Juneau Wharf
 Western (genre)
 Boot Hill Cemetery

References

Further reading

External links

 Boot Hill Museum, Dodge City, Kansas
 A tombstone in Boot Hill Cemetery in Tombstone, Arizona, from a Library of Congress website

American frontier
Cochise County conflict